This is a list of Trinidadian football transfers during the 2012–13 season. Only moves featuring at least one TT Pro League club are listed. Transfers that were made following the conclusion of the 2011–12 season on 29 March 2012, but many transfers will only officially go through on 1 July, during the 2012–13 season, and following the season until 30 June 2013, are listed.

Players without a club cannot join one at any time, either during or in between transfer windows. Clubs within or outside the Pro League may sign players on loan at any time. If need be, clubs may sign a goalkeeper on an emergency loan, if all others are unavailable.

Transfers 
All players and clubs without with a flag are from Trinidad and Tobago. In addition, transfers involving Major League Soccer clubs in the United States and Canada technically have the league as the second party and not the listed club. MLS player contracts are owned by the league and not by individual clubs.

References

External links
Official Website
Soca Warriors Online, TT Pro League

Transfers
2012-13
Football transfers summer 2012
Football transfers winter 2012–13